New Zealand competed at the 2012 Winter Youth Olympics in Innsbruck, Austria.

Alpine skiing

New Zealand qualified 2 athletes.

Boys

Girls

Biathlon

New Zealand qualified 1 athlete.

Girls

Curling

New Zealand qualified a team.

Roster
Skip: Luke Steele
Third: Eleanor Adviento
Second: David Weyer
Lead: Kelsi Heath

Mixed team

Round Robin

Draw 1

Draw 2

Draw 3

Draw 4

Draw 5

Draw 6

Draw 7

Mixed doubles

Round of 32

Round of 16

Freestyle skiing

New Zealand qualified 3 athletes.

Ski Cross

Ski Half-Pipe

Ice hockey

New Zealand qualified 2 athletes.

Boys

Girls

Luge

New Zealand qualified 1 athlete.

Boys

Snowboarding

New Zealand qualified 2 athletes.

Boys

See also
New Zealand at the 2012 Summer Olympics

References

2012 in New Zealand sport
Nations at the 2012 Winter Youth Olympics
New Zealand at the Youth Olympics